Canada – Vietnam Kindergarten (CVK) is a private international kindergarten based in Ho Chi Minh City, Vietnam. The school belongs to The Canadian International School System (CISS), along with three other campuses: the Bilingual Canadian International School (BCIS), Canadian International School Vietnam (CIS) and Albert Einstein School (AES).

Commencement of the CVK campus in Phu My Hung (District 7) took place in November 2017, with a total investment of 295 billion VND. The school held an opening ceremony for the 9.847m2 campus a year later, accommodating up to 500 preschoolers. Another campus for CVK, located in Bình Chánh district, has been operating since 2016. CVK accepts preschoolers from 3 to 6 years old, based on the programs recognized by the Ministry of Education and Training (Vietnam), the International Early Years Curriculum (UK), and Character Education in Action (Canada). CVK is consulted by the Toronto District School Board, the largest school board in Canada. In 2018, CVK welcomed 350 students in District 7 and 170 students in Bình Chánh.

References

External links
 
 
 

International schools in Ho Chi Minh City
Canadian international schools in Vietnam